Fox Trot Finesse is a 1915 short silent film directed by and starring Sidney Drew. It was produced by the Vitagraph Company of America and distributed by the General Film Company.

Cast
Sidney Drew - Ferdie Crosby
Mrs. Sidney Drew - Ferdie's Wife - Eva
Ethel Lee - Ferdie's Mother-in-Law - Mrs. U. Newit

References

External links

Fox Trot Finesse(YouTube)

1915 films
American silent short films
Articles containing video clips
American black-and-white films
1915 short films
American comedy short films
1910s American films